Cacostegania is a genus of moths in the family Geometridae described by Warren in 1901.

References

Warren, W. (1901). "Drepanulidae, Thyrididae, Epiplemidae, and Geometridae from the Aethiopian region". Novitates Zoologicae. 8: 202–217.

Ennominae